Ramon Ibanga, Jr. (born August 28, 1980), known professionally as Illmind (often stylized as !llmind), is an American record producer, songwriter, and educator. As of 2012, he lives in Brooklyn, New York.

Illmind has co-written and produced hip hop, trap, pop, soul, and electronic music for labels such as Cash Money, Def Jam, and Aftermath, and has worked with artists such as Nicki Minaj, Andy Mineo, Kanye West, Drake, J. Cole, Dr. Dre, Ludacris, 50 Cent, Ariana Grande, and others. His accomplishments in 2016 include production on the new Hamilton Mixtape and Disney's Moana, both created by Lin-Manuel Miranda. Illmind has released several studio albums and had a number of songs and albums reach the music charts.

His most recent album, Human, is a collaboration with Joell Ortiz, and was released on July 17, 2015. He established his own multi-genre music company Roseville Music Group in 2014.

Early life
Ramon Ibanga, Jr. was born on August 28, 1980 in New Jersey, where he was raised in the city of Newark, New Jersey before later moving with his family to Bloomfield, New Jersey. His family provided a strong musical background, as his father was a musician and his older brother Les-Paul was even named after the late Les Paul.

Illmind started using his father's equipment to make beats around age 13, specifically learning MIDI and sequencing on a Roland KR-500 keyboard. In his early teens he developed an interest in hip hop, and started producing music in 1997.

Around 1999, he began to take production more seriously and he started sampling, using both hip hop vinyl and obscure records such as his father's old jazz and soul albums from the Philippines. He began using the program Cubase and an Akai S20 sampler around age 17.

Music career

Production
After learning sampling, Illmind began making his own beats and sounds, and in 1999 began uploading his music to online forums such as undergroundhiphop.com. Around 2001 he started participating in the Beat Society producer showcases in Philadelphia.

Illmind started his production career working with groups like Little Brother and Boot Camp Clik; he met Boot Camp Clik after being introduced through Khrysis, and he started working with Little Brother after being introduced to their music around 2000. His first official collaborative release with the latter was Nobody Like Me.

In March 2004 Illmind's remix of the Jay-Z's Black Album, called The Black and Tan Album, was released to a positive review in The New York Times, who stated "Sparse is the aesthetic for !llmind's remixes, which set out to do more with less: techno boops, ticking drums, laid-back bass lines, three or four notes from a guitar or keyboard. Illmind's minimalism makes Jay-Z sound almost nonchalant." Sha Money XL, a G-Unit executive, served as Illmind's manager for several years. During this time, Illmind went on to produce songs with Erykah Badu, 50 Cent, Ludacris, Lloyd Banks, Prodigy, Kool G Rap, Redman, Scarface, LL Cool J, El Da Sensei, Diamond D, KRS-One, and others. He produced the 2008 Akrobatik hip hop album Absolute Value.

In summer of 2012, Illmind's track "The Morning" was included on Cruel Summer, a compilation album released on Kanye West's G.O.O.D. Music label. The song peaked at 19 on the US Billboard Bubbling Under Hot 100 Singles chart, and 49 on Hot R&B/Hip-Hop Songs.

The genesis of the track was 2007, when Illmind met Chicago-rapper Rhymefest and started sending him beats. "For a couple of years,  I just kept sending him stuff whenever I had Kanye or him in mind. It must have been 100 beats. And then I get a phone call ... from Rhymefest ... asking for a session to a beat I made. Then he was like, 'I think Kanye wants to use this for a Pusha T song.' Then a  few hours later, he's like 'We got Raekwon on this.' The first time I heard the complete album was when it leaked. And I heard it, and I lost it. I would say my life has definitely changed since that moment."

In 2008 he won the Philadelphia Red Bull Big Tune Beat Battle. Since 2012, he has shared the stage in beat showcases with artists such as Kanye West, Just Blaze, Nottz, and Don Cannon. Illmind produced music for Hoodie Allen's mixtape, Crew Cuts.  The single "Cake Boy" premiered on February 11, 2013 via YouTube with over 30,000 views in the first day.

In 2015, Illmind helped Skyzoo on the album Music for My Friends, producing five tracks. and helping Skyzoo co-produce the track "Luxury". He was executive producer for Andy Mineo's album, Uncomfortable, which released on September 18.

Towards the end of 2016, Illmind produced the outro credits for Disney's Moana, a track titled "You're Welcome", featuring both Lin-Manuel Miranda and Jordan Fisher.

Beyond his work on the Disney project the producer took an active role in working on The Hamilton Mixtape, released via Atlantic Records. In addition to his work on the project with artists such as Nas, Common, The Roots, Ingrid Michaelson, and others, Illmind has his own track, "Take a Break – Interlude", on the album.

In 2017, Illmind worked with Future, Khalid, Lil Uzi Vert, Bryson Tiller, A Boogie wit da Hoodie, Meek Mill, and others on their respective major label releases.

In 2018, Illmind worked with Beyonce and Jay-Z on the album Everything Is Love, to co-produce the song "Heard About Us" with Boi-1da, and also produced "Bigger Than You" with 2 Chainz.

Studio albums
In 2005, he produced and released an entire album on the label BBE with fellow producer Symbolyc One called The Art Of Onemind, which featured artists such as Ghostface Killah. He released The Official !llmind Remix Album in 2009 on myx, and a 2010 LP with lyricist Skyzoo called Live From The Tape Deck on Duck Down Records.

In May 2010, lyricist and rapper Skyzoo had announced that he and Illmind were collaborating on an album called Live from the Tape Deck. Recording sessions took place at Big China Studios in Brooklyn, New York in 2010. The entire album was produced, mixed and arranged by Illmind, and was mastered by Ricardo Gutierrez.!

Live from the Tape Deck debuted at #3 on the Billboard Top Heatseekers Albums. The album entered the Top Rap Albums, peaking at #16, as well as entering at #30 on the Top Independent Albums and #33 on the Top R&B/Hip-Hop Albums. The album was met with positive reviews from music critics. Spin'''s Mosi Reeves gave the album a seven out of ten, saying: "On this duo's debut full-length, Skyzoo was nicely complemented by !llmind's production, which ranges from the Dilla-like soul loop of "#Allaboutthat" to the fuzzy '70s-cop-show funk of 'The Now or Never.' Live from the Tape Deck is full of stolid striver anthems...but the album's meat-and-potatoes consistency remains bracing throughout."Beh!nd the Curta!n, Illmind's first official instrumental album, came out on April 19, 2011 through Brooklyn-based Nature Sounds Records. He followed this up with the second instrumental album #BoomTrap EP, an eight-track EP released in January of 2014. He shortly after released the drum kit #BoomTrap "The Drums", which includes extracts from the EP. Only 200 copies of the kit were offered. His most recent album, Human, is a collaboration with Joell Ortiz, and will be released on July 17, 2015.

Business and teaching
!llmind has been featured in magazines and online publications such as Scratch Magazine (Top 20 Best Producers), Hip Hop Weekly, Mass Appeal, The Source, XXL, Hiphopgame.com, and Hiphopdx.com. In the summer of 2012 !llmind started offering consulting services as a member the online service Blazetrak, and he later formed an independent online consultation service.

As of July 2012, Illmind was a senior contributor at BeatTips.com. He taught music production at the non-profit organization Harlem Children’s Zone from 2007–09, and he was later hired by the Clive Davis Department Of Recorded Music at NYU as a Technical Music Instructor for a program called "Future Music Moguls."

He has received a great deal of recognition for his continued contributions to the producer community at large as an educator, business man and innovator in the space.  Beyond launching the premier drum kit business within the music world, he has launched a "Pass The Aux", workshop series, and is committed to daily one on one interaction with the upcoming producer community.

Style and equipment

Illmind has called himself a fan of producers such as J Dilla and Pete Rock, but writes and produces a variety of genres. About his style, he has stated "I just try to create the music I like, period. I've got a pretty diverse taste in music, so I’m managing to not get bored, which is awesome. There's a lot of talent out there, and I think that’s what continues to drive me as well."!

Discography

Studio albums

Mixtapes
2008: Blaps, Rhymes & Life2009: Blaps, Rhymes & Life, Vol II2009: Blaps, Rhymes & Life, Vol III2009: Blaps, Rhymes & Life, Vol IV2011: Blaps, Rhymes & Life, Vol V''

Selected production credits

Peak chart positions

Timeline
The following is an incomplete list of albums and singles produced by Illmind/!llmind.

See also

List of hip hop musicians
List of record producers

Further reading
iLLmind – Going Behind The Curtain Pt. 1 by Nature Sounds (April 2011)

References

External links

!llmind.biz
!llmind Blap-Kits
!llmind on Twitter (Official)

Living people
New York University faculty
American hip hop record producers
Hip hop record producers
Musicians from New Jersey
American musicians of Filipino descent
Record producers from New Jersey
Twitch (service) streamers
1980 births